Nova Almeida is a neighbourhood (bairro in Portuguese) in the municipality of Serra, in the State of Espírito Santo, Brazil. It has a population of around 266,800.

History
Nova Almeida was founded in 1556 by Jesuit priests who wanted to spread the Christian faith amongst native Amerindians. First founded under the name "Reis Magos" (now the name of the river at whose mouth it rests), it was then known as "Aldeia Nova" (taking that name from neighbouring Aldeia Nova, which today is Santa Cruz). It later changed to its current name, Nova Almeida. Around 1760, there were about 3000 Tupiniquim Amerindians living here, forming the bulk of Nova Almeida's population.

Geography
It is now considered part of the Greater Vitória metropolitan area, since it lies within Serra.

Economy
This town has undergone great transformation in the last 30 years or so; from a typical rural area, it has become an international hub for commerce and industry. Today, it has two large-scale ports as part of its infrastructure and a number of industrial enterprises.

Neighbourhoods in Brazil
Populated places established in 1556
1556 establishments in the Portuguese Empire